Lamoria baea is a species of snout moth in the genus Lamoria. It was described by West in 1931, and is found in the Philippines.

References

Moths described in 1931
Tirathabini